K. M. Kader Mohideen (born 5 January 1940) is an Indian politician and social worker from Tamil Nadu. He currently serves as the National President of the Indian Union Muslim League.

Mohideen represented Vellore Constituency in Parliament (Lok Sabha) on as a Dravida Munnetra Kazhagam (D M K) member in the 14th Lok Sabha (2004—2009).

Life and career 
Mohideen was born to Mohamed Hanif and Kasimbibi at Thirunallur, Pudukkottai District on 05 Jan 1940. He was educated at University of Madras. Mohideen entered public life with Muslim Students Federation, the student's wing of Indian Union Muslim League.

He also served as Tamil Nadu state President, Indian Union Muslim League.

Parliamentary committees 

 Committee on Home Affairs
 Consultative Committee, Ministry of Power
 Joint Parliamentary Committee on Wakf

University Senates 

 University of Madras, 1977 - 1980
 Standing Committee, Bharathidasan University, Tiruchy, 1980

References

Living people
Indian Tamil people
Lok Sabha members from Tamil Nadu
1940 births
India MPs 2004–2009
Indian Union Muslim League politicians
People from Pudukkottai
Indian Union Muslim League politicians from Tamil Nadu
People from Vellore district